Baghagha is a village in Bignona Department in the Ziguinchor Region in the area of Basse Casamance in the south-west of Senegal.

In the 2002 census 770 inhabitants in 305 households were recorded.

References

External links
PEPAM

Populated places in the Bignona Department